The Sin Woman is a lost 1917 American silent drama film starring Irene Fenwick as a vamp, the period slang for a femme fatale. The trailer for it still survives.

Plot
As described in a film magazine, the film begins with Eve being tempted in the Garden of Eden, followed by the antecedents of the main character being tried and convicted for vampire work at various times. Which leads to a beautiful young woman, Grace Penrose (Fenwick), who due to her heredity leads the life of a vampire. She tires of the city life and heads for her lodge in the mountains. High up on the trail the sleigh she is riding in overturns and she is thrown in the snow. She is found by a young man, John Winthrop (Bruce), who is happily married. The young vampire becomes infatuated with him and is determined to win him, and when she finds out that he is married she wants him even more. The man leaves his wife Beth (Davies) and tells her why he is doing so. The wife says nothing, but after he leaves she tells her troubles to the female mayor, who also runs a hotel. As the son of the mayor had also been trifled with by the woman, she is anxious for revenge. The townspeople gather up some feathers and tar and head over to the lodge. As Grace is taken by the villagers to be tarred and feathered, while the husband begs for forgiveness, which is granted.

Cast
Irene Fenwick - Grace Penrose
Clifford Bruce - John Winthrop
Reine Davies - Beth Winthrop
George Morgan - Dan Pratt
Sara McVickar - Mrs. Pratt
Wellington Playter - Driver
Little Joan - Baby Winthrop

References

Preservation
The National Film Preservation Foundation states this film coming from 1922 with a question mark, while other sources claim this film being released in 1917.

External links

Trailer for film, National Film Preservation Foundation

1917 films
American silent feature films
American black-and-white films
Lost American films
1917 drama films
Silent American drama films
Tarring and feathering in the United States
1917 lost films
Lost drama films
1910s American films
1910s English-language films